Pistoia (is a city and comune in the Italian region of Tuscany, the capital of a province of the same name, located about  west and north of Florence and is crossed by the Ombrone Pistoiese, a tributary of the River Arno. It is a typical Italian medieval city, and it attracts many tourists, especially in the summer. The city is famous throughout Europe for its plant nurseries.

History

Pistoria (in Latin other possible forms are Pistorium or Pistoriae) was a centre of Gallic, Ligurian and Etruscan settlements before becoming a Roman colony in the 6th century BC, along the important road Via Cassia: in 62 BC the demagogue Catiline and his fellow conspirators were slain nearby. From the 5th century the city was a bishopric, and during the Lombardic kingdom it was a royal city and had several privileges. Pistoia's most splendid age began in 1177 when it proclaimed itself a free commune: in the following years it became an important political centre, erecting walls and several public and religious buildings.

In 1254 the Ghibelline town of Pistoia was conquered by the Guelph Florence; this did not pacify the town, but led to marked civil violence between "Black" and "White" Guelph factions, pitting different noble families against one another. In the Inferno of Dante, we encounter a particularly violent member of the Black faction of Pistoia, Vanni Fucci, tangled up in a knot of snakes while cursing God, who states: (I am a) beast and Pistoia my worthy lair. Pistoia remained a Florentine holding except for a brief period in the 14th century, when a former abbott, Ormanno Tedici, became Lord of the city. This did not last long, since his nephew Filippo sold the town to Castruccio Castracani of Lucca. The town was officially annexed to Florence in 1530.

One of the most famous families of the city was that of the Rospigliosi, owners of agricultural estates and wool merchants; the Rospigliosi provided a pope in 1667 with Giulio Rospigliosi, who briefly reigned as Clement IX (1667–69), and gave several cardinals to the church.

In 1786 a famous Jansenist episcopal synod was convened in Pistoia.

According to one theory, Pistoia lent its name to the pistol, which started to be manufactured in Pistoia during the 16th century. But today, it is also notable for the extensive plant nurseries spreading around it. Consequently, Pistoia is also famous for its flower markets, as is the nearby Pescia.

Geography
Pistoia borders with the municipalities of Agliana, Alto Reno Terme, Cantagallo, Lizzano in Belvedere, Marliana,Montale, Quarrata, Sambuca Pistoiese, San Marcello Piteglio and Serravalle Pistoiese.

Government

Frazioni (Districts)

Culture
Literature
In Anatole France's novel The Wicker-Work Woman, the Ospedale del Cappo in Pistoia is mentioned for its "vigor and truth" depicted on the "frieze of painted terracotta that surrounds the hospital".
Cinema
Pistoia has been a setting for numerous works of fiction and movies, including films, such as I Love You in All the Languages in the World, Amici miei, and Medici: Masters of Florence.
Music

 Pistoia Blues, an international music festival held since 1980. It is one of the most important European blues festivals. Artists such as B.B. King, Bob Dylan and David Bowie have attended and performed at the festival.
 Giostra dell'Orso ("Joust of the Bear"), a ceremony that is mentioned even in a chronicle dating back to 1300, when a dozen riders organized a ritual combat against a bear. Despite many changes, this traditional ceremony was staged every year until 1666, when the abandonment was recorded by the ritual celebration of the people. It was restarted in 1947, and takes place on July 25.

Main sights
Although less visited than other cities in Tuscany, the medieval city within Pistoia's old walls is charming and well-preserved.

Piazza del Duomo
The large Piazza del Duomo, dominated by the cathedral, is lined with other medieval buildings, such as the Palazzo del Comune and the Palazzo del Podestà: it is the setting (in July) of the Giostra dell'Orso ("Bear Joust"), when the best horsemen of the city's traditional quarters tilt with lances at a target held up by a dummy shaped like a bear.

The original Cathedral of San Zeno (5th century) burned down in 1108, but was rebuilt during the 12th century, and received incremental improvements until the 17th century. The façade has a prominent Romanesque style, while the interior received heavy Baroque additions which were removed during the 1960s. Its outstanding feature is the Altar of St James, an exemplar of the silversmith's craft begun in 1287 but not finished until the 15th century. Its various sections contain 628 figures, the total weighing nearly a ton.

In the square is also the 14th-century Baptistry, in Gothic style, with white and green striped marble revetment characteristic of the Tuscan Gothic.

The Palazzo dei Vescovi ("Bishops' Palace"), is characterized by a Gothic loggiato on the first floor. It is known from 1091, initially as a fortified noble residence. In the 12th century it received a more decorated appearance, with mullioned windows and frescoes, of which traces remain. It was later modified in the mid-12th century (when the St. James Chapel, mentioned by Dante Alighieri in the XXIV canto of his Inferno) and in the 13th century; to the latter restoration belongs the white marble-decorated staircase, one of the most ancient examples in Italy in civil architecture. In the 14th century, the Chapel of St. Nicholas was decorated with stories of the namesake saint and other martyrs.

Religious buildings
The original project was by Giuliano da Sangallo, but works were begun in 1495 by Ventura Vitoni. The dome was commissioned by Cosimo I de' Medici to Vasari, the lantern completed in 1568 and the church consecrated in 1582. In the apse is a painting by Bernardino del Signoraccio (1493).
 Santissima Annunziata, Baroque former church known for its Chiostro dei Morti ("Cloister of the Dead").
 San Bartolomeo in Pantano (12th century).
 San Giovanni Battista (15th century). Damaged during World War II bombardments, it is now used as an exhibition center.
 San Giovanni Battista al Tempio (11th century), owned for a while by the Knights Templar and then by the Hospitaller Knights.
 San Benedetto (14th century, restored in 1630). It houses an Annunciation (1390) by Giovanni di Bartolomeo Cristiani, a St Benedict with the Redeemer (16th-century) by Florentine painter, and in the cloister Histories of the Order of the Knights of St Benedict by Giovan Battista Vanni (1660).
 San Domenico.
 San Francesco (begun 1289). Franciscan church has an unfinished façade with bichrome marble decoration. It has frescoes with Histories of St. Francis in the main chapel and other 14th–15th century frescoes.
 San Giovanni Fuoricivitas (12th–14th century), Romanesque church
 San Leone (14th century) church enlarged in the 16th–18th centuries. Its Baroque-Roccoco interior houses some notable canvases by  Giovanni Lanfranco, Stefano Marucelli and Vincenzo Meucci.
 Santa Maria delle Grazie, Pistoia
 Santa Maria in Ripalta (11th century). It houses a large Ascent of Christ fresco in the apse, attributed to Manfredino d'Alberto (1274).
 San Paolo.
 San Pier Maggiore.
 Pieve di Sant'Andrea, housing Giovanni Pisano's Pulpit of St. Andrew.
 Pieve of San Michele in Groppoli, ancient chapel now parish church.
 La Vergine.

Others
 The 14th-century walls. These had originally four gates, Porta al Borgo, Porta San Marco, Porta Carratica and Porta Lucchese, all demolished at the beginning of the 20th century.
 Ospedale del Ceppo (13th century).
 Palazzo Panciatichi
 Medici Fortress of Santa Barbara, built at first in 1331 by the Florentines, but destroyed by the Pistoiese citizens in 1343. It was rebuilt by order of Cosimo I de' Medici from 1539, and later enlarged by Bernardo Buontalenti. It sustained one single siege by the Barberini troops in 1643, before being disarmed by Grand Duke Peter Leopold in 1734. Later it was used as a barracks and military jail, while today it serves as a venue for cinema shows during the summer.
 Accademia dei Risvegliati
Palazzo Rospigliosi, Pistoia
Palazzo Rospigliosi a via del Duca
Palazzo Rospigliosi a Ripa del Sale 
 Monument in Honour of Brazilians (Soldiers and Pilots) killed in action during Italian Campaign of World War II
 Brazilian Military Cemetery of Pistoia

Sport
Football 
The city's football team U.S. Pistoiese 1921 plays in Serie C, the third flight of Italian football.
Basketball 
The city's basketball team Pistoia Basket 2000 plays in Serie A2.

Transportation

Buses
Consorzio Pistoiese Trasporti, also known as COPIT, was a company that operated since 1969 the local public transport in Pistoia and in its province. It was transformed as Società per azioni in 2000 with private and public capital, mainly by the fifteen Comuni, where operated and 30% by CTT Nord. Since 2005 made part in two consortium: BluBus and PiùBus, the first operated in the Province of Pistoia and the other in the Empoli area.

Since 1 November 2021 the public local transport is managed by Autolinee Toscane.

Train
The railway station is located on the Viareggio–Florence railway and it is at the southern end of the Porrettana railway, the original line between Florence and Bologna.

Notable residents

 Meo Abbracciavacca, 14th century poet
 Enrico Betti
 Mauro Bolognini, film director
 Giosuè Carducci 
 Cino da Pistoia
 Pope Clement IX
 Ippolito Desideri
 Renato Fondi
 Niccolò Fortiguerra
 Vanni Fucci, fictional character 
 Licio Gelli
 Lodovico Giustini
 Marino Marini
 Giovanni Michelucci
 Maria Maddalena Morelli
 Filippo Pacini

International relations

Twin towns - sister cities
Pistoia is twinned with:
 Kruševac, Serbia
 Pau, France (1975)
 Zittau, Germany

See also
Roman Catholic Diocese of Pistoia

References

Sources

 David Herlihy. Medieval and Renaissance Pistoia: the social history of an Italian town. New Haven and London, Yale University Press, 1967.

External links

 Comune of Pistoia
 Pistoia Blues Festival
  Virtual tour of the city

 
Cities founded by Rome